John Willard Thorp (June 20, 1912 – April 18, 1992) was an American aeronautical engineer who made significant contributions to aircraft design throughout his life.

Born in French Camp, California, John Thorp grew up from age four in the historic Locke family home in Lockeford, California. He was educated in the Lockeford and Lodi public schools, and the Boeing School of Aeronautics in Oakland, California. Thorp worked on the Boeing 247 final assembly line and then returned to teach at the Boeing School. Starting flying in 1929, he received his private license in 1930 and by 1935 had flown 30 different types of aircraft in over 200 flying hours. By 1946 he had over 600 flight hours in 62 different aircraft types. Thorp started designing personal aircraft at the Boeing School. As Lockheed Assistant Preliminary Design Engineer, he was responsible for the preliminary design of the P2V "Neptune", Naval patrol bomber. This record stood for more than ten years, until finally broken in 1962 by a Boeing B-52H Stratofortress from Minot AFB, ND.

Aircraft designs
The following light aircraft were designed by John Thorp during his career:

1930s
T-1 - 1931 Design study of a two place light plane
T-2 - 1932 Design study
T-3B - 1933 Two/Four place, all metal, retractable, built by Rudy Paulic
T-4 - 1934 Design study
T-5 - 1935 Tandem two-place trainer, built by Boeing School
T-6 - 1936 Modified T-5 with tricycle landing gear, built by Boeing School
T-7 - 1939 Design study of an all wood airplane

1940s
T-8 - 1940 Design study
T-9 - 1941 Design study
Mod 33 1942 Lockheed Model 33 Little Dipper single place for flying infantryman
Mod 34 1943 Lockheed Model 34 Big Dipper two place single engine pusher
T-10 - 1944 Series "I" Sky Skooter - Taildragger - proposed engine Franklin 2AC-99 50 hp
T-11 - 1945 Sky Skooter,  Lycoming O-145. FAR Part 23 certification
TL-1 - 1948 Design study - Liaison Airplane

1950s

 T-111 - 1953 Sky Skooter,  Lycoming O-145. FAR Part 23 certification.
 T-211 - 1963 Sky Skooter,  Continental O-200. FAR Part 23 certification.
 T-12 - 1945-50 Design study.
 T-13 - 1950 FL-23, high wing observation prototype built by Fletcher Aviation.
 T-14 - 1951 FD-25, "Defender" armed light plane,  Continental, by Fletcher Aviation.
 T-15 - 1952 FU-24, agricultural aircraft for Aerial Topdressing market, prototype built by Fletcher Aviation, large scale production in New Zealand.
 T-16 - 1956-58 180 hp, Piper Cherokee preliminary design.
 T-17 - 1958 Wing Derringer original design. Began as twin engine Skooter.

1960s
 T-18 - 1960 All metal two place, high performance homebuilt.
Don Taylor's T-18 was first homebuilt to fly around the world.
Clive Canning flew his T-18 from Australia to England and return.
 T-19 - 1962 Design study - Four place, twinjet aircraft using Williams Research engine.

1970s
 T-20 - 1971 Design study - Single place, open cockpit sport plane
 T-21 - 1971 Design study - Utility airplane.
 T-22 - 1972 Design study - Sport plane.
 T-23 - 1972 Design study - Single place high performance sport plane.
 SE5-F 1973 WWI replica - Prototype built.
 T-28 - 1974 Design study - Two place, twin engine airplane based on the T-18.

References

External links
 Designer Spotlight: John Thorp – Kitplanes

American aerospace engineers
1912 births
1992 deaths
People from French Camp, California
Engineers from California
20th-century American engineers